Streptomyces griseoaurantiacus is a thermotolerant bacterium species from the genus of Streptomyces which was isolated from marine sediment. Streptomyces griseoaurantiacus produces the antibiotics manumycin, diperamycin and chinikomycin, and griseolic acid.

See also 
 List of Streptomyces species

References

Further reading

External links
Type strain of Streptomyces griseoaurantiacus at BacDive – the Bacterial Diversity Metadatabase

griseoaurantiacus
Bacteria described in 1970